Peter Hardcastle is the name of:

Peter Hardcastle (footballer), English professional footballer active in the 1970s
Peter Hardcastle (rower) (born 1978), Australian three time Olympic rower.